"The Bleeding" is a song by American heavy metal band Five Finger Death Punch. It is the lead single from the band's first album The Way of the Fist (2007), released through Firm Music.

Meaning and background
When asked by Blistering.com about what happened with his former band Motograter, vocalist Ivan Moody said: 

"The Bleeding" was written by Moody about his ex-fiancé and his former band Motograter. In an interview with Blistering.com, Moody spoke about what "The Bleeding" is about: 

When Five Finger Death Punch performed a show in Arizona, the girl who Moody wrote "The Bleeding" about, his ex-fiancé, was at the show. It was the first time Moody saw her in about a year. Moody spoke about it, saying: 

When Moody spoke about the first time he heard "The Bleeding", he said:

Music video

A music video for the song, directed by Bradley Scott, was shot in Los Angeles on July 7–8, 2007. The video features actress Danielle Harris as Ivan Moody's girlfriend, and writer/director Sxv'leithan Essex, who also appeared in Five Finger Death Punch's video for the song "Never Enough" and directed the video for their song "The Way of the Fist". The video was released on July 27, 2007.

The video contains cuts of the band performing the song and a troubled couple portrayed by Harris and Moody. The video begins with Moody driving down an alley passing other members of the band and Sxv'leithan Essex and arriving at his house carrying in a box. When Moody enters the house, he pulls pictures of him and Harris out of the box. It then flashes back to the couple sitting at a table with other members of the band drinking beer, with Harris appearing to be uninterested in talking to Moody. They accidentally spill a beer and the couple then suddenly begin to fight, and bassist Matt Snell then pulls Moody away from his girlfriend. After the fight, it cuts to shots of Harris crying in the mirror and the couple having sex. It then shows Moody reading a letter and Harris taking a large amount of pills. At the end of the video, Harris' feet are shown dangling, implying she had hanged herself. The video ends with Moody taking an urn out of the box and spreading her ashes on the bed.

Moody commented on the video concept: "The video was a concept of mine. We were sitting around a table wondering how to project the visual for that song. One of our favorite songs of ours. I wanted it to be painful. Danielle Harris is the actress ... she was in The Last Boy Scout and the Halloween movies .. I sat down with her and racked her brain about it. It seemed logical to follow the lyrics and make it about what I went through relationship wise. The suicide part is just reality. There are situations out there that are hard to push through. I wanted that video to reconstruct how I felt when I was writing that song."

Versions
There are five versions of the song:

 Album version – This version of the song is included in every edition of The Way of the Fist album.
 "Screamless" version – This version of the song is available as a single on the iTunes library and contains none of the screaming from the album version. The song is shorter than the original because the scream near the beginning of the song was completely removed.
 Acoustic version – This version, known as "The Bleeding (Acoustic)" or "The Bleeding (Unplugged)" is a version of the song performed entirely on acoustic instruments. New vocals were recorded with no screaming, as well as new guitar, drum, and bass tracks. This version came with the band's debut EP, Pre-Emptive Strike, and also with the re-release of The Way of the Fist.
 Instrumental version – This was released on the bonus disc of The Way of the Fist: Iron Fist Edition.
 Re-recorded version – This version of the song is on the upcoming re-recorded release of The Way of the Fist, and despite being the same length as the original version, the vocals, the bass, drum, and the guitar are new and the opening scream is removed.

Track listing

Personnel
Five Finger Death Punch
Ivan Moody – vocals
Darrell Roberts – guitars (original version)
Zoltan Bathory – guitars
Matt Snell – bass (original version)
Jeremy Spencer – drums (original version)
 Chris Kail - bass (re-recorded version)
 Charlie Engen - drums (re-recorded version)
 Andy James - guitars (re-recorded version)
Additional personnel
Uros Raskovski – guitar solo (original version)

References

2007 debut singles
2007 songs
Five Finger Death Punch songs
Songs written by Ivan Moody (vocalist)
Heavy metal ballads